The Hastings Half-Marathon is a road running event that takes place every March around the streets of Hastings. Starting in 1985 and organised by The Hastings Lions Club the race has become quite popular over the last few years, with calls for it to be crowned The Great South Run, attracting 5,000 entries every year. It has been voted best race of its kind in the UK for three years. In 2005 it was voted fifth best race in the UK and was voted number 23 in the list of the Top 50 2007 races in the UK by readers of Runners' World. The 35th edition of the half marathon took place on 24 March 2019.

Course

The route has a total climb of 237 metres with an average climb rate of 18 metres per mile.

The course circumnavigates the ancient town of Hastings, starting at the Seafront and following the route of William the Conqueror towards Battle, East Sussex, around the back of the town and down to the famous 'Old Town' and fishing village of Hastings, then back along the three-mile (5 km) seafront back to where it started. Although tough for the first part of the course, runners have produced some very fast times and PBs, as the last two-thirds is flat or downhill, and then the finish on the promenade.

Past winners
Key:

All information from Association of Road Racing Statisticians.

References

External links

Runners World

Sport in Hastings
Sport in East Sussex
Half marathons in the United Kingdom
Athletics competitions in England